Lewisia brachycalyx is a species of flowering plant in the family Montiaceae, known by the common name short-sepal bitter-root or shortsepal lewisia. It is native to the mountains of the southwestern United States and Baja California, where it grows in moist habitat such as meadows.

Description
Lewisia brachycalyx is a deciduous perennial growing from a short thick taproot and caudex unit. It produces a basal rosette of thick, fleshy, blunt-tipped narrow leaves up to 8 centimeters long. The inflorescence is under 4 centimeters tall, taking the form of a cluster of several flowers sitting atop the leaf rosette. Each flower has 5 to 9 shiny white or pink petals about 2 centimeters long. At the center are many stamens and stigmas clumped together. The Latin specific epithet brachycalyx means “having a short calyx”.

The genus Lewisia was moved in 2009 from the purslane family (Portulacaceae) with adoption of the APG III system, which established the family Montiaceae.

Cultivation
This plant is hardy down to  but requires well-drained, acid to neutral pH soil in full sun. It becomes dormant after flowering in the summer. It is a suitable subject for an alpine garden where it can be given the conditions that best replicate its natural habitat. It has gained the Royal Horticultural Society’s Award of Garden Merit.

References

External links
Jepson Manual Treatment
Photo gallery

brachycalyx